Forever is a 1921 American silent romance film, also known as Peter Ibbetson, that was written by Ouida Bergère and directed by George Fitzmaurice. It was adapted from George du Maurier's 1891 novel Peter Ibbetson, which was made into a play of the same name by John N. Raphael.

The sole remaining copy was held until the 1970s by Wallace Reid's widow Dorothy Davenport, who donated it for a proposed museum archive, but the film is now considered lost.

Plot

Peter Ibbetson (Reid) is an orphan raised by his uncle, Colonel Ibbetson. When the Colonel insults his dead mother, Peter attacks him and is ordered from the house. Then the young man runs into his childhood sweetheart, Mimsi (Ferguson), and their romantic feelings are rekindled.

Unfortunately, Mimsi has married, but they carry on a love affair in their dreams. Their dream-affair continues over the years, even after Peter kills her husband, the Duke of Towers, and gets a life prison sentence.

Cast

Proposed film
Famous Players-Lasky had planned in 1919 to bring all three Barrymores, Lionel, Ethel and John to the screen in a lavish production of the Du Maurier novel Peter Ibbetson for that year. Thereby John and Lionel would repeat their 1917 Broadway stage success. Ethel had played a part in getting the play produced. John had been making comedies for the Paramount for five years, Ethel had been under contract to Metro Pictures but Ethel's contract was ending that same year. Lionel freelanced in and out of Metro to companies like Paramount and First National. If produced the film would have united all three Barrymore siblings in their second film but also in the same scenes. A previous silent film National Red Cross Pageant (1917) had all three siblings but not in the same scenes. Never produced, the Peter Ibbetson project met the screen in the film known as Forever with Wallace Reid and Elsie Ferguson.

See also
List of lost films
Wallace Reid filmography

References

External links

Progressive Silent Film List: Forever at silentera.com

1921 films
American silent feature films
American black-and-white films
American romantic drama films
Films based on works by George du Maurier
Films directed by George Fitzmaurice
Lost American films
Famous Players-Lasky films
Films with screenplays by Ouida Bergère
1921 romantic drama films
1921 lost films
Lost romantic drama films
1920s American films
Silent romantic drama films
Silent American drama films
1920s English-language films